Ava Alice Muriel Astor (July 7, 1902 – July 19, 1956) was an American heiress, socialite, and member of the Astor family. She was the daughter of John Jacob Astor IV and Ava Lowle Willing, and sister of Vincent Astor and half-sister of John Jacob Astor VI.

Early life
Ava Astor was born on July 7, 1902, in Manhattan, New York. She was the only daughter of Colonel John Jacob "Jack" Astor IV (1864–1912) and Ava Lowle Willing (1868–1958).

Her paternal grandparents were real estate businessman and race horse breeder/owner William Backhouse Astor, Jr. (1829–1892) and socialite Caroline Webster "Lina" Schermerhorn (1830–1908), while her maternal grandparents were businessman Edward Shippen Willing (1822–1906) and socialite Alice Bell Barton (1833–1903).

In September 1911, Ava and her mother moved to England. They lived in her townhouse on Grosvenor Square in Mayfair, London (from October–April) and her country estate, Sutton Place in Guildford, Surrey (from May–September), and she was educated at Notting Hill High School.

Personal life
On July 24, 1924, Ava Astor married Prince Sergei Platonovich "Serge" Obolensky, son of General Platon Sergeyevich Obolensky and Maria Konstantinovna Naryshkina, at Savoy Chapel in London. The marriage was considered the event of the season in England that year.

Her brother Vincent gave her a Palladian Revival stone residence on his estate near Rhinebeck, New York. The house was north of his own "Ferncliff Casino" ("Astor Courts") and also overlooked the Hudson River. Ava named it "Marienruh" and retained it through her life. Before divorcing Serge in 1932, they had two children:

 Prince Ivan Sergeyevich Obolensky (1925–2019), who married Claire McGinnis in 1949. They divorced in 1956 and he married Mary Elizabeth Morris in 1959.
 Princess Sylvia Sergeyevna Obolensky (1931–1997), who married Jean-Louis Ganshof van der Meersch, in 1950. They divorced in 1957 and she married Prince Azamat Kadir Guirey, in 1957. They divorced in 1963.

On January 21, 1933, she married Raimund von Hofmannsthal (1906–1974), son of Gertrud Schlesinger and Hugo von Hofmannsthal, an Austrian novelist, librettist, and dramatist. He was said to be the father of Sylvia. The couple was married in the city court of Newark, New Jersey. Together, the couple had a daughter:

 Romana von Hofmannsthal (1935–2014), who married Roderick McEwen, a son of Sir John McEwen, 1st Baronet, in 1958.

From 1936 to 1937, she had an affair with English choreographer Sir Frederick Ashton (1904–1988), despite the fact that he was gay. After the affair ended, her love for him continued, though she had two subsequent marriages, both to gay Englishmen. Ava and Raimund eventually divorced in 1939, and Raimund later married Lady Elizabeth Paget (a daughter of Charles Paget, 6th Marquess of Anglesey).

On March 27, 1940, she married Philip John Ryves Harding (1906–1972), a journalist, in Faversham, England. At the time of their wedding, Harding, a cousin of Maxwell Eley, was serving with an anti-aircraft battery in the British Army.  Before their divorce in 1945, they had one daughter:

 Emily Sophia Harding (1941–2019), who married architect Michael Zimmer, a son of Heinrich Zimmer (and nephew of her second husband Raimund), on 29 June 1963. They divorced and she later married Eric Glanbard and artist Clark Murray in 2017.

On May 12, 1946, she had her fourth and final marriage to David Pleydell-Bouverie (1911–1994), the grandson of William Pleydell-Bouverie, 5th Earl of Radnor, in Reading, Vermont. Pleydell-Bouverie was an architect who studied at Charterhouse School in England.

Death

Astor died of a stroke in her 219 East Sixty-first Street apartment, Manhattan, New York City, on July 19, 1956, at age 54. She predeceased her mother by two years.  She was a patron of the arts, including the ballet companies of London and New York City.

Her will was admitted to probate on November 5, 1956, in Manhattan Surrogate Court. Her assets, totaling $5,305,000, (equivalent to approximately $ in  dollars) were divided among her four children. At her mother's death in 1958, her children received an additional $2,500,000 (equivalent to approximately $ in  dollars)

References

Obolensky family
Ava
Livingston family
Schermerhorn family
Hofmann von Hofmannsthal
20th-century American Episcopalians
1902 births
1956 deaths
People educated at Notting Hill & Ealing High School